A liver metastasis is a malignant tumor in the liver that has spread from another organ affected by cancer. The liver is a common site for metastatic disease because of its rich, dual blood supply (the liver receives blood via the hepatic artery and portal vein). Metastatic tumors in the liver are 20 times more common than primary tumors. In 50% of all cases the primary tumor is of the gastrointestinal tract; other common sites include the breast, ovaries, bronchus and kidney. Patients with Colorectal cancer will develop liver metastases during the disease 

Tumor emboli entering the sinusoids through the liver blood supply appear to be physically obstructed by the Kupffer cells, but if tumor emboli are larger, they tend to become lodged in the portal venous branches.

Presentation 
 Hepatomegaly - with a nodular free edge of liver
 Tenderness
 Cachexic
 Ascites
 Jaundice
 Pyrexia - up to 10% of patients
 Alkaline Phosphatase (ALP) and gamma glutamyl transpeptidase (GGT) elevated
 Ultrasound scan and CT scan - multiple filling defects.

Diagnosis 
 Hemoglobin decrease
 Liver function test: ALP elevated, bilirubin elevated, albumin decrease
 Carcinoembryonic antigen for colorectal secondaries
 Ultrasound scan
 CT scan
 Biopsy under ultrasound control

Treatment 
Treatment can consist of surgery (hepatectomy), chemotherapy and/or therapies specifically aimed at the liver like radiofrequency ablation, transcatheter arterial chemoembolization, selective internal radiation therapy and irreversible electroporation. For most patients no effective treatment exists because both lobes are usually involved, making surgical resection impossible. Younger patients with metastases from colorectal cancer confined to one lobe of the liver and up to 4 in number may be treated by partial hepatectomy. In selected cases, chemotherapy may be given systemically or via hepatic artery.

In some tumors, notably those arising from the colon and rectum, apparently solitary metastases
or metastases to one or other lobes may be resected. A careful search for other metastases is required, including local recurrence of the original primary tumor (e.g., via colonoscopy) and dissemination elsewhere (e.g., via CT of the thorax). 5-year survival rates of 30-40% have been reported following resection. 

When resection for cure is not possible (R0 resection), percutaneous ethanol injection has been suggested to dehydrate and kill the tumour cells, however there is not enough evidence to determine the effectiveness and safety of this approach.

References

External links 

Hepatology
Digestive system neoplasia